Southside Township may refer to the following townships in the United States:

 Southside Township, Kearny County, Kansas
 Southside Township, Wright County, Minnesota